Ivana Brkljačić (born 25 January 1983 in Villingen-Schwenningen, West Germany) is a former female hammer thrower from Croatia.

Career
She achieved good results as a teenager, winning the World Junior Championships twice and finishing 11th in the 2000 Olympic finals at the age of 17. In the hammer throw contest at the 2004 Olympics she missed qualification to the final round by 6 centimetres.

Her personal best throw, and also a national record, is 75.08 metres, set at the June 2007 EAA meeting in Warsaw.

In 2009 Brkljačić became a director of the Hanžeković Memorial, a member of the IAAF World Challenge series of athletics meetings.

On 27 May 2010 Brkljačić announced her retirement from professional sport. Her last competition appearance was at the 2008 IAAF World Athletics Final in Stuttgart.

Achievements

References

External links

1983 births
Living people
Croatian female hammer throwers
Athletes (track and field) at the 2000 Summer Olympics
Athletes (track and field) at the 2004 Summer Olympics
Athletes (track and field) at the 2008 Summer Olympics
Olympic athletes of Croatia
Franjo Bučar Award winners
Croatian sports executives and administrators
Athletes (track and field) at the 2001 Mediterranean Games
Athletes (track and field) at the 2005 Mediterranean Games
Mediterranean Games competitors for Croatia
20th-century Croatian women
21st-century Croatian women